Stinking Creek is a stream in Knox County, Kentucky, in the United States.

Stinking Creek was so named because hunters were known to leave stinking corpses of animals they killed lying in and around the stream.

See also
List of rivers of Kentucky

References

Rivers of Knox County, Kentucky
Rivers of Kentucky